Irene Hirst (11 July 1930 – 1 July 2000) was a British gymnast. She competed at the 1948 Summer Olympics and the 1952 Summer Olympics.

References

1930 births
2000 deaths
British female artistic gymnasts
Olympic gymnasts of Great Britain
Gymnasts at the 1948 Summer Olympics
Gymnasts at the 1952 Summer Olympics
Sportspeople from Bradford
20th-century British women